Nour El Sayed (born 9 January 1984), is an Egyptian footballer who plays for Egyptian Premier League side Al Ittihad as a defensive midfielder. He's from Banha, Egypt.

Honours
Zamalek
Egypt Cup (2): 2013, 2014

References

External links
 

1984 births
Living people
People from Benha
Egyptian footballers
Association football defenders
Egypt international footballers
Egyptian Premier League players
Botola players
Egyptian expatriate footballers
Expatriate footballers in Morocco
El Gouna FC players
Zamalek SC players
Difaâ Hassani El Jadidi players
ENPPI SC players
Al Ittihad Alexandria Club players